Michael or Mike Skinner may refer to:

Mike Skinner (racing driver) (born 1957), American NASCAR competitor, inaugural NASCAR Truck Series champion
Michael Skinner (rugby union) (born 1958), former English rugby player
Mike Skinner (musician) (born 1979), British rapper/musician who performed using the stage name, The Streets
Michael Skinner (biologist) (born 1956), American molecular biologist and fertility specialist
Michael Skinner (magician) (1941–1998), American close-up magician